Oak Bowery is an unincorporated community in southern Chambers County, Alabama, United States. It lies along U.S. Route 431, north of Auburn.

Demographics

History 
Oak Bowery was first settled in 1828 by South Carolinians and was originally named Woodlawn. A Methodist camp meeting ground named Oak Bowery was established there soon after settlement, and the community adopted that name around 1835.  In 1837, the Oak Bowery Female College was established, and in 1850 the East Alabama Masonic College located there.  The community grew rapidly in the 1830s and 1840s, but a change in the planned routing of the Montgomery and West Point Railroad from Oak Bowery to a more southerly route ended the community's growth.  Oak Bowery is today a small community of only a few residences and a church.

Notable people
Robert Lee Bullard - general, U.S. Army
James Ferguson Dowdell - U.S. Representative
James Render Dowdell - chief justice, Supreme Court of Alabama
Samuel Porter Jones - evangelist
John William Jones - U.S. Representative
William J. Samford - Governor of Alabama

Gallery

Bibliography
Miriam Ann Kirkwood Syler, "Oak Bowery, Historic Community", Lee County and Her Forebears. (Montgomery, Ala.: Herff Jones, 1983).
Bob Crouch and Joe Harrington, Oak Bowery United Methodist Church, retrieved February 7, 2009.
Isabella Margaret Elizabeth Blandin, History of Higher Education of Women in the South Prior to 1860, (New York:, Neale Pub. Co., 1909), 112.

References 

Unincorporated communities in Alabama
Unincorporated communities in Chambers County, Alabama
Populated places established in 1828